Mporokoso is a constituency of the National Assembly of Zambia. It covers the towns of Mporokoso and Mukunsa in Mporokoso District of Northern Province.

List of MPs

References

Constituencies of the National Assembly of Zambia
1964 establishments in Zambia
Constituencies established in 1964